This article displays the squads for the 2013 World Men's Handball Championship. Each team consists of 16 players.

A provisional squad list was published on 19 December 2012, of those 28-players lists, the 16 participating players must be selected.

Group A

Head coach: Eduardo Gallardo

Head coach: Jordi Ribera

Head coach: Claude Onesta

Head coach: Martin Heuberger

Head coach: Zoran Kastratović

Head coach: Alain Portes

Group B

Head coach: Luis Capurro

Head coach: Ulrik Wilbek

Head coach: Aron Kristjánsson

Head coach: Zvonko Šundovski

Head coach: Borut Maček

Head coach: Oleg Kuleshov / Alexander Rymanov

Group C

Head coach: Iouri Chevtsov

Head coach: Michael Biegler

Head coach: Nenad Kljaić

Head coach: Veselin Vuković

Head coach: Boris Denič

Head coach: Lee Sang-Sup

Group D

Head coach: Salah Bouchekriou

Head coach: Taip Ramadani

Head coach: Slavko Goluža

Head coach: Assem Daoud

Head coach: Lajos Mocsai

Head coach: Valero Rivera

Statistics

Coaches representation by country
Coaches in bold represent their own country.

References

World Mens Handball Championship Squads, 2013
2013 squads